Welcome to Rockville is a four-day hard rock and heavy metal music festival. The festival is held annually at the Daytona International Speedway in Daytona Beach, Florida.

History

The first Welcome to Rockville was a one-day event held on Mother's Day, May 8, 2011, at Metropolitan Park in Jacksonville, Florida. The festival ran all day Sunday, beginning around 11:00 am and ending after 10:00 pm due to city noise ordinances. It was hosted by Juliya Chernetsky and headlined by Godsmack.

A second festival was held on Sunday, April 29, 2012, which featured Jacksonville, Florida natives Shinedown to headline the festival along with Korn.

The Welcome to Rockville festival was expanded from a one-day event to a two-day event in 2013, and Jacksonville native band Lynyrd Skynyrd headlined with Alice in Chains. The 2013 festival marked the start of a minor controversy about the enforcement of the city's noise ordinances with respect to the festival.

The 2014 festival was headlined by Avenged Sevenfold and Korn.

The festival was expanded to 3 days (Friday-Sunday) in 2018.

In July 2019, Danny Wimmer Presents submitted a press release that stated Welcome to Rockville was moving to Daytona Beach, Florida.

In March 2020, it was announced that the festival would be cancelled due to the COVID-19 pandemic but would return in 2021.

In 2021, Welcome to Rockville returned for a new week, November 11–14, at its new home in Daytona Beach, Florida, headlined by Slipknot, Metallica, and Disturbed. Welcome to Rockville's 10th year brought in a record attendance of 161,000 people. It was quoted as being the largest rock festival in America in 2021. In addition, 1.2 million viewers live streamed select performances on Twitch. Danny Wimmer Presents announced that Welcome to Rockville would be returning in May 2022.

Welcome to Rockville 2022 was held May 19–22. Set to headline were Kiss, Korn, Guns N' Roses, and Foo Fighters. Kiss performed on Thursday. Korn and Guns N' Roses, among some other acts, were forced to cancel their performances on Friday and Saturday due to severe weather. Foo Fighters cancelled their performance due to the death of their drummer, Taylor Hawkins, they were replaced by Nine Inch Nails, who performed on Sunday.

Estimated yearly attendance
 2011 – 10,000 sold-out event
 2012 – 11,000 sold-out event
 2013 – 25,000 (two-day total)
 2014 – 40,000 (two-day total) sold-out event
 2015 – 50,000 (two-day total) sold-out event
 2016 – 50,000 (two-day total) sold-out event
 2017 – 75,000 (two-day total)
 2018 – 90,000 (three-day total) sold-out event
 2019 – 99,000 (three-day total) sold-out event
 2021 – 161,000 (four-day total)
 2022 – 140,000 (four-day total)

Lineup

2011

Main Stage:
 Godsmack
 Stone Sour
 Seether
 Theory of a Deadman
 Puddle of Mudd
 Skillet
 Halestorm
 Son of a Bad Man

Budweiser Stage:
 Cold
 My Darkest Days
 Cavo
 Rev Theory
 Art of Dying
 Down Theory
 Bleeding in Stereo

Jägermeister Stage:
 Red Jumpsuit Apparatus
 Revis
 Fit for Rivals
 Six Shot Revival
 Mindslip
 Viktr
 Broken Trust
 Manna Zen
 Efen
 In Whispers

2012

Main Stage 1:
 Korn
 Evanesence
 Halestorm
 Trivium
 Adelitas Way
 Otherwise
 Soulswitch

Main Stage 2:
 Shinedown
 Five Finger Death Punch
 P.O.D.
 Lacuna Coil
 Art of Dying
 Eye Empire

2013

Monster Energy Stage East:
 Alice in Chains
 Stone Sour
 Papa Roach
 Halestorm
 All That Remains
 Pop Evil

Monster Energy Stage West:
 Limp Bizkit
 Three Days Grace
 Bullet for My Valentine
 Asking Alexandria
 In This Moment
 Young Guns

Emerging Artist Stage:
 Escape the Fate
 Otherwise
 Whitechapel
 Gemini Syndrome
 Hell or High Water
 Rockville Rumble Winner

Jaxlive Stage:
 Rockville Rumble Winner
 Edens Fill
 Rockville Rumble Winner
 Rockville Rumble Winner
 Stars in Stereo
 MonstrO
 Rockville Rumble Winner

Monster Energy Stage East:
 Lynyrd Skynyrd
 3 Doors Down
 Skillet
 Filter
 Saving Abel
 Red

Monster Energy Stage West:
 Shinedown
 Buckcherry
 Hollywood Undead
 Steel Panther
 Nonpoint
 Farewell 2 Fear

Emerging Artist Stage:
 Nothing More
 Device
 Motionless in White
 Saliva
 Girl On Fire
 Soulswitch
 Nebraska Bricks

Jaxlive Stage:
 Rockville Rumble Winner
 Rockville Rumble Winner
 Rockville Rumble Winner
 Rockville Rumble Winner
 The Apprehended
 (N)ception

2014

Monster Energy West Stage:
 Avenged Sevenfold
 A Day to Remember
 Chevelle
 Hellyeah
 Adelitas Way
 Rev Theory
 Digital Summer

Monster Energy East Stage:
 The Cult
 Volbeat
 Alter Bridge
 Chiodos
 Middle Class Rut
 Gemini Syndrome

Jägermeister stage:
 We Came as Romans
 Memphis May Fire
 Smile Empty Soul
 Evergreen Terrace
 Silvertung
 World Gone

Ernie Ball Stage:
 Fozzy
 Devour the Day
 We as Human
 Monster Truck
 Cathercist

Monster Energy West Stage:
 Korn
 Five Finger Death Punch
 Seether
 Sick Puppies
 Within Reason

Monster Energy East Stage:
 Rob Zombie
 Staind
 Theory of a Deadman
 Black Stone Cherry
 The Pretty Reckless

Jägermeister stage:
 Motionless in White
 Emmure
 Lacuna Coil
 Kyng
 Ghost of War

Ernie Ball Stage:
 Trivium
 Butcher Babies
 Nothing More
 Twelve Foot Ninja

2015

Jacksonville Landing Stage:
 Hollywood Undead
 Nonpoint
 Avatar
 36 Crazyfists
 World Gone
 Scare Don't Fear

Monster Energy Main Stage:
 Korn
 Slayer
 Halestorm
 Of Mice & Men
 Hollywood Undead
 Stars in Stereo

Jack Daniel's Met Park Main Stage:
 Marilyn Manson
 Ministry
 Queensrÿche
 Scott Weiland and the Wildabouts
 Nonpoint
 Like a Storm

ReverbNation Stage:
 Suicidal Tendencies
 Testament
 Exodus
 Fozzy
 Sons of Texas
 Red Sun Rising

Jägermeister Stage:
 The Devil Wears Prada
 Periphery
 Beartooth
 Upon a Burning Body
 Sangre
 World Gone

Monster Energy Main Stage:
 Slipknot
 Papa Roach
 The Pretty Reckless
 In This Moment
 We Are Harlot

Jack Daniels Met Park Main Stage:
 Godsmack
 Slash featuring Myles Kennedy and The Conspirators
 Breaking Benjamin
 Motionless in White
 Young Guns
 '68

ReverbNation Stage:
 All That Remains
 Hatebreed
 Butcher Babies
 Starset
 ReverbNation Band
 Shattered Sun

Jägermeister Stage:
 In Flames
 Tremonti
 Vamps
 Islander
 From Ashes to New

2016

Monster Energy Righty Stage:
 Shinedown
 Bring Me the Horizon
 Pennywise
 Bullet for My Valentine
 Trivium
 Wilson

Monster Energy Lefty Stage:
 Disturbed
 Sixx:A.M.
 Hellyeah
 Asking Alexandria
 Red Sun Rising
 Monster Truck

Metropolitan Stage:
 3 Doors Down
 Collective Soul
 Pop Evil
 Candlebox
 Filter
 Lacey Sturm

River Stage:
 Escape the Fate
 Crown the Empire
 Enter Shikari
 Miss May I
 Cane Hill
 Big Jesus

Monster Energy Righty Stage:
 Rob Zombie
 A Day to Remember
 Cypress Hill
 P.O.D.
 Sick Puppies
 From Ashes to New

Monster Energy Lefty Stage:
 ZZ Top (canceled)
 Megadeth
 Sevendust
 Yelawolf
 Texas Hippie Coalition
 Glorious Sons

Metropolitan Stage:
 Five Finger Death Punch
 Lamb of God
 Ghost
 We Came as Romans
 Memphis May Fire
 Avatar

River Stage:
 Anthrax
 Clutch
 Parkway Drive
 Issues
 Beartooth

2017

Monster Energy Stage:
 Soundgarden
 The Offspring
 Coheed and Cambria
 Eagles of Death Metal
 All That Remains
 I Prevail
 Goodbye June

Metropolitan Stage:
 A Perfect Circle
 Mastodon
 The Pretty Reckless
 Highly Suspect
 Starset
 Dinosaur Pile-Up
 Badflower

River Stage:
 Pierce the Veil
 In Flames
 Frank Carter & The Rattlesnakes
 Volumes
 Royal Republic
 As Lions
 The Charm The Fury

Monster Energy Stage:
 Def Leppard
 Papa Roach
 Three Days Grace
 Of Mice & Men
 The Dillinger Escape Plan
 Nothing More
 Rival Sons

Metropolitan Stage:
 Chevelle
 Seether
 Alter Bridge
 In This Moment
 Motionless in White
 Beartooth
 Kyng

River Stage:
 Amon Amarth
 Gojira
 Every Time I Die
 Attila
 Sylar
 Fire from the Gods
 Cover Your Tracks

2018

Monster Energy Stage:
 Ozzy Osbourne (ft. Zakk Wylde)
 Five Finger Death Punch
 The Used
 Underoath
 Texas Hippie Coalition
 MDFK

Metropolitan Stage:
 Godsmack
 Halestorm
 Parkway Drive
 Trivium
 '68
 Palisades

River Stage:
 Atreyu
 Power Trip
 Toothgrinder
 Bad Wolves
 Them Evils

Monster Energy Stage:
 Avenged Sevenfold
 Breaking Benjamin
 Hollywood Undead
 Black Veil Brides
 Sevendust
 Avatar
 Tyler Bryant & the Shakedown

Metropolitan Stage:
 Stone Sour
 Stone Temple Pilots
 Asking Alexandria
 Pop Evil
 Red Sun Rising
 Joyous Wolf

River Stage:
 Andrew W.K.
 Butcher Babies
 Stick to Your Guns
 Palaye Royale
 He Is Legend
 The Wild!
 Yashira

Monster Energy Stage:
 Foo Fighters
 Billy Idol
 Bullet for My Valentine
 Greta Van Fleet
 Red Fang
 The Bronx

Metropolitan Stage:
 Queens of the Stone Age
 Clutch
 Thrice
 Quicksand
 The Sword
 Fireball Ministry

River Stage:
 Baroness
 Wolf Alice
 Turnstile
 The Fever 333
 Spirit Animal

2019

Monster Energy Stage:
 Korn
 Chevelle
 Flogging Molly
 Tom Morello
 Hyro the Hero
 Hands Like Houses
 Dirty Honey

Metropolitan Stage:
 Evanescence
 The Crystal Method
 Killswitch Engage
 Beartooth
 Light the Torch
 Amigo the Devil

River Stage:
 Circa Survive
 Mark Lanegan Band
 Black Pistol Fire
 Wilson
 Demob Happy
 Cleopatrick

Monster Energy Stage:
 Rob Zombie
 Shinedown
 In This Moment
 Black Label Society
 The Damned Things
 Dead Girls Academy

Metropolitan Stage:
 Judas Priest
 The Cult
 Skillet
 Tremonti
 Badflower
 Crobot

River Stage:
 Yelawolf
 Zeal and Ardor
 Wage War
 Movements
 Boston Manor

Monster Energy Stage:
 Tool
 Bring Me the Horizon
 The Interrupters
 Fever 333
 Yungblud
 The Glorious Sons
 Hyde

Metropolitan Stage:
 Incubus
 Papa Roach
 The Struts
 Reignwolf
 Dorothy
 The Dirty Nil

River Stage:
 Meshuggah
 Architects
 grandson
 While She Sleeps
 SHVPES

2021

Space Zebra Stage:
 Cypress Hill
 Grandson
 Dead Sara
 Spiritbox
 Dana Dentata

Octane Stage:
 Slipknot
 A Day to Remember
 Gojira
 Dorothy
 Teenage Wrist
 Siiickbrain

Rockvillian Stage:
 Brass Against
 Nascar Aloe
 Jeris Johnson
 Blame My Youth
 Contracult Collective

Twitch Stage:
 Them Evils
 Revision, Revised
 The Alpha Complex
 A War Within
 Scarlett O'hara
 Dead Reckoning
 Shadow the Earth
 As You Were

Space Zebra Stage:
 Metallica
 Social Distortion
 Pennywise
 Ice Nine Kills
 Ayron Jones
 Austin Meade

Octane Stage:
 Rob Zombie
 Chevelle
 Beartooth
 Starset
 Zero 9:36
 Whit3 Collr

Rockvillian Stage:
 Wage War
 Butcher Babies
 Amigo the Devil
 Bad Omens
 Tallah
 Eva Under Fire

Twitch Stage:
 Zero 9:36
 Whit3 Collr
 Divided Truth
 ReBirth
 Tragic
 VENTRUSS
 The Coursing
 As You Were

Space Zebra Stage:
 Staind
 The Offspring
 Badflower
 Fever 333
 Dead Poet Society
 Brkn Love

Octane Stage:
 Disturbed
 Lamb of God
 Asking Alexandria
 Atreyu
 Sick Puppies
 Fame on Fire

Rockvillian Stage:
 Gwar
 Crown the Empire
 3Teeth
 All Good Things
 Joyous Wolf
 Reach NYC

Twitch Stage:
 Magnolia Bayou
 Actus Reus
 Widow7
 Timmy Taylor
 NoSelf
 Troy
 Higher Ground
 As You Were

Space Zebra Stage:
 Metallica
 Mudvayne
 Falling in Reverse
 Sleeping with Sirens
 Alien Weaponry
 Goodbye June

Octane Stage:
 Lynyrd Skynyrd
 Mastodon
 Anthrax
 Dance Gavin Dance
 Fire from the Gods
 Survive the Sun

Rockvillian Stage:
 Code Orange
 Jelly Roll
 The Warning
 Avoid
 Hero the Band
 As You Were

Twitch Stage:
 Lone Wolf
 The Dev
 Imperial Tide
 Lines of Loyalty

2022

Space Zebra Stage:
 Kiss
 Papa Roach
 Black Label Society
 Mammoth WVH
 Fuel
 Plush

Octane Stage:
 Five Finger Death Punch
 In This Moment
 Clutch
 Bad Wolves
  Oxymorrons
  Tetrarch
 Widow7

Rockvillian Stage:
 Down
 Ill Niño
 Shaman's Harvest
 Gemini Syndrome
 Contracult Collective

DWPresents Stage:
 The Sword
 Bad Omens
 Redlight King
 Devil's Cut
 Post Profit
 As You Were

Space Zebra Stage:
 Korn (Cancelled)
 Megadeth (Cancelled)
 Ministry (Set cut short)
 Baroness
 Blacktop Mojo
 Diamante

Octane Stage:
 Breaking Benjamin (Cancelled)
 Seether
 Skillet (Cancelled)
 Sevendust
 Ded
 Giovannie and the Hired Guns

Rockvillian Stage:
 Underoath(Cancelled)
 RED
 Tyler Bryant & the Shakedown
 Stick to Your Guns
 Archetypes Collide

DWPresents Stage:
 We Came as Romans
 Whitechapel
 Mike's Dead
 Extinction A.D.
 Young Other
 As You Were

Space Zebra Stage:
 Guns N' Roses (Cancelled)
 Rise Against (Cancelled)
 Jerry Cantrell (Set cut short)
 Dirty Honey (Cancelled)
 Saint Asonia (Set cut short)
 Against the Current

Octane Stage:
 Shinedown (Stopped after 4 songs)
 Bush (Cancelled)
 Nothing More
 The Violent 
 John Harvie

Rockvillian Stage:
 In Flames (Set cut short)
 John 5 (Set cut short)
 Agnostic Front
 S8nt Elektric 
 Afterlife

DWPresents Stage:
 Crown the Empire
 The Word Alive
 Stiched Up Heart
 A River Runs Thru It
 As You Were

Space Zebra Stage:
 Nine Inch Nails (Replaced the Foo Fighters)
 Porno for Pyros (Replaced Jane's Addiction)
 The Pretty Reckless
 Poppy
 Lilith Czar
 Superbloom

Octane Stage:
 The Smashing Pumpkins
 Halestorm
 The Struts
 Spiritbox
 Radkey

Rockvillian Stage:
 The Hu
 Bones UK
 Motor Sister
  Aeir
  The Mysterines

DWPresents Stage:
 Escape the Fate
 Lacey Sturm
 Crobot
 The Dead Deads
 NVRLESS
 As You Were

2023

 Slipknot
 Rob Zombie
 Queens of the Stone Age
 Puscifer
 Trivium
 Bullet for My Valentine
 Suicidal Tendencies
 Avatar
 Black Stone Cherry
 Converge
 Band-Maid
 Austin Merde
 Bloodywood
 Stray from the Path
 Brutus
 Rain City Drive
 Malevolence
 Vended
 Rivals
 Nevertel
 Widow7
 Conquer Divide
 Budderside

 Avenged Sevenfold
 Evanescence
 Hardy
 I Prevail
 Motionless in White
 Sleeping with Sirens
 Badflower
 Ayron Jones
 Memphis May Fire
 From Ashes to New
 Born of Osiris
 The Warning
 Mothica
 Des Rocs
 Varials
 Tallah
 Tigercub
 Slay Squad
 Ryan Oakes
 Tuk Smith and The Restless Hearts 
 Bastardane
 OTTTO
 Until I Die
 As You Were

 Pantera 
 Godsmack
 Alice Cooper
 Chevelle 
 Alter Bridge
 Jason Bonham's Led Zeppelin Evening
 Knocked Loose
 Rival Sons
 Yelawolf Presents: Sometimes Y
 Pop Evil
 Suicide Silence
 Sepultura
 The Bronx
 Poorstacy
 Ho99o9
 Zero 9:36
 Maylene and the Sons of Disaster
 Dayseeker
 Dead Poet Society
 Kreator
 The Violent
 Starcrawler
 Hammerhedd

Tool
 Deftones
 Incubus
 The Mars Volta
 Coheed & Cambria
 Pennywise
 Ghostemane
 Grandson
 Sueco
 Filter 
 Deafheaven
 Anti-Flag
 Senses Fail
 New Years Day
 Nothing,Nowhere
 Angel Dust
 Nova Twins
 Point North
 Wargasm
 Bob Vylan
 Capital Theatre
 Uncured
 Reddstar

References

External links
 Official website

Heavy metal festivals in the United States
Music of Jacksonville, Florida
Rock festivals in the United States
2011 establishments in Florida